Olang is a comune (municipality) in South Tyrol in northern Italy, located about  northeast of the city of Bolzano.

Geography

Olang borders the following municipalities: Bruneck, Mareo, Prags, Rasen-Antholz, and Welsberg-Taisten.

Frazioni
The municipality of Olang contains the frazioni (subdivisions, mainly villages and hamlets) Geiselsberg (Sorafurcia), Mitterolang (Valdaora di Mezzo), Niederolang (Valdaora di Sotto) and Oberolang (Valdaora di Sopra).

History

Coat-of-arms
The emblem is argent a bend vert on which are represented three cart’s wheels. The wheels symbolize the villages of Mitterolang, Oberolang and Niederolang and their disposition in the valley. The emblem was granted in 1968.

Society

Linguistic distribution
According to the 2011 census, 96.47% of the population speak German, 3.18% Italian and 0.34% Ladin as first language.

Demographic evolution

References

External links

 Homepage of the municipality

Municipalities of South Tyrol